Soviet submarine K-55 may refer to one of the following submarines of the Soviet Navy:

 , a K-class submarine; decommissioned in 1954 and scrapped
 , an Hotel-class (or Project 658) nuclear submarine; decommissioned in 1989 and scrapped

Soviet Navy ship names